The  Billings Outlaws season was the team's eleventh and final season as a professional indoor football franchise and second in the Indoor Football League (IFL). One of twenty-five teams competing in the IFL for the 2010 season, the Billings, Montana-based Billings Outlaws were members of the Pacific North Division of the Intense Conference.

Under the leadership of head coach Heron O'Neal, the team played their home games at the Rimrock Auto Arena at MetraPark in Billings, Montana.

On October 7, 2010 the Outlaws announced they would cease operations due to not having enough money for the 2011 season, this was in large part due to a disagreement with county commissioners over funding non-insured losses suffered during the 2010 tornado that severely damaged the Rimrock Auto Arena.

Schedule

Regular season

Playoffs

Standings

Roster

2010 player awards

References

Billings Outlaws
Billings Outlaws
Billings Outlaws
United Bowl champion seasons